Mama Tits is the stage name of Brian Daniel Peters, an American drag performer.

Career 
Peters began exploring drag as a teenager in Nampa, Idaho. He joined the Sisters of Perpetual Indulgence at the age of 24. Mama Tits has been described as a "singer, storyteller and comedian". According to Joseph Brand of Seattle Spectator, she's also a performer, event hostess, and life coach.

In Seattle, Mama Tits has hosted drag brunch at Unicorn. She was featured in the comic book Mama Tits Saves the World, which according to Jennifer Campbell of The Stranger "immortalizes the moment at Seattle Pride 2014 when she faced down a group of hate-spewing antigay protesters with her steely spine and wicked humor". A video of the incident was viewed 1.8 million times, as of November 2015. Covering the confrontation, Bustle's Elizabeth Ballou called Mama Tits "our new gay pride hero".

Mama Tits has hosted a show called Sweet Like Candy. As of 2016, she hosted the drag brunch show Mimosas with Mama in Seattle. Her show Mayhem with Mama was held for one night at The Triple Door in 2016, before continuing in Puerto Vallarta. Her other shows in Puerto Vallarta have included Mama Tits Triple D at The Red Room and Mama Tits: Big and Loud at Act II. As of 2022, Palm Cabaret and Bar hosts her show Por Qué No? – Life Is Short.

Personal life 
Peters is married and lives in Puerto Vallarta, as of 2019.

See also 

 List of LGBT people from Seattle

References

External links 

 

Living people
American comedians
American drag queens
American singers
LGBT people from Washington (state)
People from Seattle